Luke Joshua Bodnar (born 19 May 2000), is an Australian professional footballer who plays as a defender for Perth Glory. He made his professional debut on 18 November 2020 against Shanghai Greenland Shenhua in the 2020 AFC Champions League.

References

External links

2000 births
Living people
Australian soccer players
Australian people of Romanian descent
Association football defenders
Perth Glory FC players
National Premier Leagues players